The 2016 Touring Car Endurance Series powered by Hankook was the first season of the Touring Car Endurance Series (TCES). Creventic was the organiser and promoter of the series. The races were contested with touring cars. The 24H Silverstone and the 24H Epilog Brno were part of both the TCES and the 24H Series.

Calendar

Entry list

Results and standings

Race results
Bold indicates overall winner.

See also
Touring Car Endurance Series
2016 24H Series

Notes

References

External links

Touring Car Endurance Series
Touring Car Endurance Series
Touring Car Endurance Series
Touring Car Endurance Series